José Alberto "Pepe" Soto Gómez (born January 11, 1970 in Lima) is a Peruvian football manager and former player. Nicknamed "Pepe," he played as a central defender and spent the majority of his playing career with Alianza Lima. He is the brother of footballers Jorge Soto and Giancarlo Soto.

Club career
Soto started his club career with Deportivo Municipal in 1987. He also played for Sporting Cristal and Alianza Lima in Peru.

Soto spent several seasons playing in Mexico, joining Puebla in the Invierno 1996 season and remaining with the club until 1998. He also represented Celaya during 1999 and 2000.

International career
Soto obtained 75 international caps for the Peru national team, scoring three goals. He made his debut on November 25, 1992 in a 1-1 draw against Ecuador, and played his last international match at age 33 in a World Cup qualifying defeat against Chile on September 9, 2003. Soto's international career included the Copa América tournaments of 1993, 1995, 1999, and 2001.

Coaching career
On December 17, 2011, Soto was appointed head manager of Alianza Lima for the start of the 2012 Torneo Descentralizado season.

Honours

Player
Sporting Cristal
 Torneo Descentralizado: 1995

Alianza Lima
 Apertura: 2001, 2004, 2006
 Clausura: 2003
 Torneo Descentralizado: (4) 2001, 2003, 2004, 2006

Manager
Alianza Lima
 Peruvian Reserve League: 2011

Personal life 
Has a son named Jose Soto and a daughter named Maria Soto. The mother of his children is Monica De La Jara. He is also the older brother of Jorge Soto and Giancarlo Soto.

References

External links
 
 International statistics at rsssf
 
 
 

1970 births
Living people
Footballers from Lima
Association football central defenders
Peruvian footballers
Peru international footballers
Peruvian Primera División players
Liga MX players
Deportivo Municipal footballers
Sporting Cristal footballers
Club Puebla players
Club Alianza Lima footballers
Club Celaya footballers
Peruvian football managers
Club Alianza Lima managers
1993 Copa América players
1995 Copa América players
1999 Copa América players
2000 CONCACAF Gold Cup players
2001 Copa América players
Peruvian expatriate footballers
Expatriate footballers in Mexico
Peruvian expatriate sportspeople in Mexico
León de Huánuco managers
Carlos A. Mannucci managers
Juan Aurich managers